The plain-brown woodcreeper (Dendrocincla fuliginosa), is a sub-oscine passerine bird which breeds in the tropical New World from Honduras through South America to northern Argentina, and in Trinidad and Tobago. Sometimes it is considered to include the plain-winged woodcreeper (D. turdina) as a subspecies.

This woodcreeper is typically 22 cm long, and weighs 37 g. It is drab even by woodcreeper standards. As its name implies, it lacks the streaking shown by most of its relatives, and is plain brown above and below. The bill is longish and straight.

The normal call is a loud stick, but when following army ants, the groups keep up a noisy chatter. The song is a descending te-te-te-tu-tu-tu-tue-tue-tue-chu-chu-chu.

The plain-brown woodcreeper is an insectivore which feeds on ants and other insects. It feeds low in trees, on the trunk or foliage, but rarely on the ground. It will follow columns of army ants, often in groups of up to a dozen birds. If specialist ant feeders like antbirds or larger woodcreepers are present, it tends to keep higher than those species. It also accompanies South American coatis (Nasua nasua) on their foraging excursions, especially when they feed in trees during the dry season. Though it may eat the occasional army ant and coatis might benefit from the birds spotting predators before they do, in both cases the plain-brown woodcreeper is typically a commensale, snatching prey that flees before the more formidable predators.

This woodcreeper is a common and widespread forest bird which builds a leaf-lined nest in a palm tree stump; two or three white eggs are laid.

Footnotes

References
 de Mello Beisiegel, Beatriz (2007): Foraging Association between Coatis (Nasua nasua) and Birds of the Atlantic Forest, Brazil. Biotropica 39(2): 283–285.  (HTML abstract)
 ffrench, Richard; O'Neill, John Patton & Eckelberry, Don R. (1991): A guide to the birds of Trinidad and Tobago (2nd edition). Comstock Publishing, Ithaca, N.Y.. 
 Hilty, Steven L. (2003): Birds of Venezuela. Christopher Helm, London.

External links
Plain-brown woodcreeper photo gallery VIREO Photo-High Res
Photo-Medium Res; Article sunbirdtours
Photo-High Res; Article https://www.nhlstenden.com/"Suriname Birds"—Map and 2 photos-High Res
Photo-High Res; Article pbase.com–(purple-black legs & reddish brown tailfeathers-!)

plain-brown woodcreeper
Birds of Costa Rica
Birds of Panama
Birds of Colombia
Birds of Venezuela
Birds of Ecuador
Birds of Trinidad and Tobago
Birds of the Guianas
Birds of the Amazon Basin
Birds of Brazil
plain-brown woodcreeper
plain-brown woodcreeper